Architectural lighting design is a field of work or study that is concerned with the design of lighting systems within the built environment, both interior and exterior.  It can include manipulation and design of both daylight and electric light or both, to serve human needs.

Lighting design is based in both science and the visual arts.  The basic aim of lighting within the built environment is to enable occupants to see clearly and without discomfort. The objective of architectural lighting design is to balance the art and the science of lighting to create mood, visual interest and enhance the experience of a space or place whilst still meeting the technical and safety requirements.

Overview 

The purpose of architectural lighting design is to balance the characteristics of light within a space to optimize the technical, the visual and, most recently, the non-visual components of ergonomics with respect to illumination of buildings or spaces.

The technical requirements include the amount of light needed to perform a task, the energy consumed by the lighting within the space and the relative distribution and direction of travel for the light so as not to cause unnecessary glare and discomfort.  The visual aspects of the light are those that are concerned with the aesthetics and the narrative of the space (e.g. the mood of a restaurant, the experience of an exhibition within a museum, the promotion of goods within a retail space, the reinforcement of corporate brand) and the non-visual aspects are those concerned with human health and well-being.

As part of the lighting design process both cultural and contextual factors also need to be considered. For example, bright lighting was a mark of wealth through much of Chinese history, but if uncontrolled bright lights are known to be detrimental to insects, birds, and the view of stars.

History 
The history of electric light is well documented, and with the developments in lighting technology the profession of lighting developed alongside it.  The development of high-efficiency, low-cost fluorescent lamps led to a reliance on electric light and a uniform blanket approach to lighting, but the energy crisis of the 1970s required more design consideration and reinvigorated the use of daylight.

The Illuminating Engineering Society of North America (IESNA) was formed in 1906 and the UK version was established in 1909 (now known as the Society of Light and Lighting and part of CIBSE).  The International Commission on Illumination (CIE) was established in 1913 and has become a professional organization accepted as representing the best authority on the subject matter of light and lighting.  The Institution of Lighting Professionals was established as the Association of Public Lighting Engineers in 1924.  Around the world similar professional organizations evolved.

Initially, these industry organizations were primarily focused on the science and engineering of lighting rather than the aesthetic design, but in 1969 a group of designers established the International Association of Lighting Designers (IALD).  Other associations purely for lighting design include the Professional Lighting Designers' Association (PLDA) established in 1994, the Association de Concepteurs Eclairage (ACE) in France established 1995, the Associazione Professionisti dell'Illuminazione (APIL) in Italy established in 1998, the Associação Brasileira de Arquitetos de Iluminação in Brazil in 1999 and the Professional Association of Lighting Designers in Spain (APDI) established in 2008.

As a profession 

Architectural lighting designer is a stand-alone profession that sits alongside the professions of architecture, interior design, landscape architecture and electrical engineering.

One of the earliest proponents of architectural lighting design was Richard Kelly who established his practice in 1935.  Kelly developed an approach to architectural lighting that is still used today, based on the perception of three visual elements as presented in a 1952 joint meeting of The American Institute of Architects, the American Society of Industrial Designers (now the Industrial Designers Society of America), and the Illuminating Engineering Society of North America, in Cleveland.

Education 
While many architectural lighting designers have a background in electrical engineering, architectural engineering, architecture, or luminaire manufacturing, several universities and technical schools now offer degree programs specifically in architectural lighting design.

Process 
The process of architectural lighting design generally follows the architect's plan of works in terms of key project stages: feasibility, concept, detail, construction documentation, site supervision and commissioning.

After the feasibility stage, where the parameters for the project are set, the concept stage is when the lighting design is developed in terms of lit effect, technical lighting targets and overall visual strategy usually using concept sketches, renderings, or mood boards.

Day lighting 
For colors based on black-body theory, blue occurs at higher temperatures, while red occurs at lower, cooler, temperatures. This is the opposite of the cultural associations attributed to colors, in which red represents hot, and blue cold.

Fixtures 

Lighting fixtures come in a wide variety of styles for various functions. The most important functions are as a holder for the light source, to provide directed light and to avoid visual glare. Some are very plain and functional, while some are pieces of art in themselves. Nearly any material can be used, so long as it can tolerate the excess heat and is in keeping with safety codes.

An important property of light fixtures is the luminous efficacy or wall-plug efficiency, meaning the amount of usable light emanating from the fixture per used energy, usually measured in lumen per watt. A fixture using replaceable light sources can also have its efficiency quoted as the percentage of light passed from the "bulb" to the surroundings. The more transparent the lighting fixture is, the higher efficacy. Shading the light will normally decrease efficiency but increase the directionality and the visual comfort probability.

The PH-lamps are a series of light fixtures designed by Danish designer and writer Poul Henningsen from 1926 onwards. The lamp is designed with multiple concentric shades to eliminate visual glare, only emitting reflected light, obscuring the light source.

Photometric studies 

Photometric studies are performed to simulate lighting designs for projects before they are built or renovated.  This enables architects, lighting designers, and engineers to determine whether a proposed lighting layout will deliver the amount of light intended. They will also be able to determine the contrast ratio between light and dark areas. In many cases these studies are referenced against IESNA or CIBSE recommended lighting practices for the type of application.  Depending on the type of area, different design aspects may be emphasized for safety or practicality (i.e. such as maintaining uniform light levels, avoiding glare or highlighting certain areas).  A specialized lighting design application is often used to create these, which typically combine the use of two-dimensional digital CAD drawings and lighting simulation software.

Color temperature for white light sources also affects their use for certain applications. The color temperature of a white light source is the temperature in kelvin of a theoretical black body emitter that most closely matches the spectral characteristics of the lamp. Incandescent light bulbs have a color temperature around 2700 to 3000 kelvin; daylight is around 6400 kelvin. Lower color temperature lamps have relatively more energy in the yellow and red part of the visible spectrum, while high color temperatures correspond to lamps with more of a blue-white appearance.  For critical inspection or color matching tasks, or for retail displays of food and clothing, the color temperature of the lamps will be selected for the best overall lighting effect.  Color may also be used for functional reasons.  For example, blue light makes it difficult to see veins and thus may be used to discourage drug use.

Correlated color temperature 

The correlated color temperature (CCT) of a light source is the temperature of an ideal black-body radiator that radiates light of comparable hue to that of the light source. Color temperature is a characteristic of visible light that has important applications in lighting, photography, videography, publishing, manufacturing, astrophysics, horticulture, and other fields. In practice, color temperature is only meaningful for light sources that do in fact correspond somewhat closely to the radiation of some black body (i.e. those on a line from red-orange via yellow and more or less white to blueish white); it does not make sense to speak of the color temperature of (e.g. a green or a purple light). Color temperature is conventionally stated in the unit of absolute temperature, the kelvin, having the unit symbol K.

For lighting building interiors, it is often important to take into account the color temperature of illumination. For example, a warmer (i.e. lower color temperature) light is often used in public areas to promote relaxation, while a cooler (higher color temperature) light is used to enhance concentration in offices.

CCT dimming for LED technology is regarded as a difficult task, since binning, age and temperature drift effects of LEDs change the actual color value output. Here feedback loop systems are used for example with color sensors, to actively monitor and control the color output of multiple color mixing LEDs.

The color temperature of the electromagnetic radiation emitted from an ideal black body is defined as its surface temperature in Kelvin, or alternatively in mireds (micro-reciprocal kelvin). This permits the definition of a standard by which light sources are compared.

Methods 
For simple installations, hand-calculations based on tabular data can be used to provide an acceptable lighting design. More critical or optimized designs now routinely use mathematical modeling on a computer.

Based on the positions and mounting heights of the fixtures, and their photometric characteristics, the proposed lighting layout can be checked for uniformity and quantity of illumination. For larger projects or those with irregular floor plans, lighting design software can be used. Each fixture has its location entered, and the reflectance of walls, ceiling, and floors can be entered. The computer program will then produce a set of contour charts overlaid on the project floor plan, showing the light level to be expected at the working height. More advanced programs can include the effect of light from windows or skylights, allowing further optimization of the operating cost of the lighting installation. The amount of daylight received in an internal space can typically be analyzed by undertaking a daylight factor calculation.

The Zonal Cavity Method is used as a basis for both hand, tabulated, and computer calculations. This method uses the reflectance coefficients of room surfaces to model the contribution to useful illumination at the working level of the room due to light reflected from the walls and the ceiling. Simplified photometric values are usually given by fixture manufacturers for use in this method.

Computer modeling of outdoor flood lighting usually proceeds directly from photometric data. The total lighting power of a lamp is divided into small solid angular regions. Each region is extended to the surface which is to be lit and the area calculated, giving the light power per unit of area. Where multiple lamps are used to illuminate the same area, each one's contribution is summed. Again the tabulated light levels (in lux or foot-candles) can be presented as contour lines of constant lighting value, overlaid on the project plan drawing. Hand calculations might only be required at a few points, but computer calculations allow a better estimate of the uniformity and lighting level.

Design media

Terminology 
 Recessed light  The protective housing is concealed behind a ceiling or wall, leaving only the fixture itself exposed. The ceiling-mounted version is often called a downlight.
 "Cans" with a variety of lamps  Jargon for inexpensive downlighting products that are recessed into the ceiling, or sometimes for uplights placed on the floor. The name comes from the shape of the housing.  The term "pot lights" is often used in Canada and parts of the US.
 Cove light  Recessed into the ceiling in a long box against a wall
 Troffer  Recessed fluorescent light fixtures, usually rectangular in shape to fit into a drop ceiling grid
 Surface-mounted light  The finished housing is exposed, not flush mount with surface.
 Chandelier  A branched ornamental light fixture designed to be mounted on ceilings or walls
 Pendant light  Suspended from the ceiling with a chain or pipe
 Sconce  A decorative light fixture that is mounted to a wall
 Track lighting fixture  Individual fixtures (called track heads) can be positioned anywhere along the track, which provides electric power.
 Under-cabinet light  Mounted below kitchen wall cabinets
 Emergency lighting or exit sign  Connected to a battery backup or to an electric circuit that has emergency power if the mains power fails
 High- and low-bay lighting  Typically used for general lighting for industrial buildings and often big-box stores
 Strip lights or Industrial lighting  Often long lines of fluorescent lamps used in a warehouse or factory
 Outdoor lighting and landscape lighting  Used to illuminate walkways, parking lots, roadways, building exteriors and architectural details, gardens, and parks
 Bollard  A type of architectural outdoor lighting that is a short, upright ground-mounted unit typically used to provide cutoff type illumination for egress lighting, to light walkways, steps, or other pathways
 Street light  A type of outdoor pole-mounted light used to light streets and roadways; similar to pole-mounted flood lights but with a type II lens (side to side light distribution pattern) instead of type III
 Flood lighting  Usually pole- or stanchion-mounted; for landscape, roadways, and parking lots

Lamp types 
Different types of electric lighting have vastly differing efficacy and color temperature:

*Color temperature is defined as the temperature of a black body emitting a similar spectrum; these spectra are quite different from those of black bodies.

The most efficient source of electric light is the low-pressure sodium lamp. It produces, for all practical purposes, a monochromatic yellow light, which gives a similarly monochromatic perception of any illuminated scene. For this reason, it is generally reserved for outdoor public lighting usages. Low-pressure sodium lights are favored for public lighting by astronomers, since the light pollution that they generate can be easily filtered, contrary to broadband or continuous spectra.

Incandescent light bulb 

The modern incandescent light bulb, with a coiled filament of tungsten, was commercialized in the 1920s developed from the carbon filament lamp introduced in about 1880. As well as bulbs for normal illumination, there is a very wide range, including low voltage, low-power types often used as components in equipment, but now largely displaced by LEDs.

Fluorescent lamp 

Fluorescent lamps consist of a glass tube that contains mercury vapor or argon under low pressure. Electricity flowing through the tube causes the gases to give off ultraviolet energy. The inside of the tubes are coated with phosphors that give off visible light when struck by ultraviolet energy.

LED lamp 

Light-emitting diodes (LEDs) became widespread as indicator lights in the 1970s. With the invention of high-output LEDs by Shuji Nakamura, LEDs are now in use as solid-state lighting for general lighting applications.

Initially, due to relatively high cost per lumen, LED lighting was most used for lamp assemblies of under 10 W such as flashlights. Development of higher-output lamps was motivated by programs such as the U.S. L Prize.

See also 

 Architectural glass
 Architectural light shelf
 Architecture of the night
 Daylight harvesting
 Deck prism
 Light art
 Light + Building
 Light tube
 Lighting control system
 Lighting for the elderly
 Lumen method
 Over illumination
 Passive solar building design
 Professional Lighting and Sound Association (PLASA)
 Seasonal affective disorder (SAD)
 Skylight
 Smart glass
 Stage lighting
 Sun path
 Sustainable lighting
 Transom (architectural)
 Vivid Sydney

References

External links 
 Lighting design glossary

 
Garden features

it:Lighting design
sv:Ljusdesign